The scaled piculet (Picumnus squamulatus) is a species of bird in subfamily Picumninae of the woodpecker family Picidae. It is found in Colombia and Venezuela.

Taxonomy and systematics

The scaled piculet has these five subspecies:

P. s. squamulatus Lafresnaye, 1854
P. s. roehli Zimmer, J.T. & Phelps, W.H., 1944
P. s. obsoletus Allen, J.A., 1892
P. s. lovejoyi Phelps, W.H. Jr. & Aveledo, 1987
P. s. apurensis Phelps, W.H. Jr. & Aveledo, 1987

Subspecies P. s. lovejoyi might not be distinctive enough to warrant treatment as a taxon.

Description

Adult males of the nominate subspecies P. s. squamulatus have a black cap with red feather tips on the forehead and white ones on the rest of it. Their face is mostly brown with black tips on some feathers and a whitish line behind the eye. Their upperparts are olive brown with a scaly appearance due to narrow black borders on the feathers. Their flight feathers are brown with yellowish edges on the secondaries and tertials. Their tail is brownish black; the innermost pair of feathers have mostly white inner webs and the outer two pairs have a white area near the tip. Their chin and throat feathers are white with narrow gray-brown tips. The rest of their underparts are whitish with scaly markings similar to those of the upperparts. Adult females are identical but for white spots on their entire crown. Juveniles are darker above than adults and the scaly pattern on their underparts is more diffuse.

Subspecies P. s. roehli often has yellow or orange spots on the forehead instead of red ones, brighter upperparts than the nominate, a brownish yellow tinge to the belly, and narrower markings on the underparts. P. s. lovejoyis forehead spots are always yellow and its upperparts are grayer than the nominate's. P. s. obsoletus has a yellow-green tinge to the upperparts and has yellowish white underparts with paler and finer "scale" markings and dark streaks in the feather centers. P. s. apurensis appears whiter than the nominate on its underparts, and the scaly marks are narrow and indistinct.

Distribution and habitat

The subspecies of scaled piculet are found thus:

P. s. squamulatus, northeastern and central Colombia
P. s. roehli, northern Colombia and northern Venezuela
P. s. obsoletus, northeastern Venezuela
P. s. lovejoyi, extreme northwestern Venezuela
P. s. apurensis, north-central Venezuela

The scaled piculet inhabits a variety of semi-open to open landscapes including gallery forest, the edges of primary forest, secondary forest, deciduous woodland, farmland with scattered trees, and pastures.

Behavior

Movement

As far as is known, the scaled piculet is a year-round resident throughout its range.

Feeding

The scaled piculet feeds on small insects. It forages on thin branches and twigs in dense vegetation or small trees, usually singly or in pairs.

Breeding

The scaled piculet's breeding season is not well defined, but appears to include October to January in Colombia and April to June (and perhaps to September) in Venezuela. Nothing else is known about its breeding biology.

Vocalization

The scaled piculet makes a "high-pitched squeaky 'chi-chi-ch’e’e’chi', becoming trill-like at [the] end."

Status

The IUCN has assessed the scaled piculet as being of Least Concern. It has a large range, and though its population size is not known it is believed to be stable. No immediate threats have been identified. It is "[p]ossibly not uncommon, and may perhaps be overlooked owing to inconspicuous behaviour." It occurs in at least two protected areas in Venezuela.

References

Further reading

scaled piculet
Birds of Colombia
Birds of Venezuela
scaled piculet